Dorado Schmitt (born May 29, 1957) is a French guitarist and violinist in Gypsy jazz.

Biography
Schmitt was born in Saint-Avold, Lorraine, France on May 29, 1957. He started playing guitar at the age of seven with his father as his teacher. His father also introduced him to violin. Schmitt composed his own pieces, incorporating improvisation and challenging techniques, among which Bossa Dorado which has become a jazz standard. He eventually became as comfortable with swing and gypsy waltz as with bossa nova and flamenco.

He established the Dorado Trio in 1978 with Gino Reinhardt on double bass and Hono Winterstein on rhythm guitar. Later, guitarist Claudio Favari joined the group and performed at the Burghausen Jazz Festival in 1983. He recorded the albums Hommage a la Romenes and in 1984 Notre Histoire. The first remained a jazz best-seller for several weeks in Germany.

Schmitt was in a car crash in 1988, leaving him in a coma for eleven days. He spent two years in rehabilitation before he could return to the trio, which recorded Gypsy Reunion in 1993 and Parisienne in 1994. He dropped out of music again in 1997 when Gino Reinhardt died. Two years passed before he assembled another group, in which he played often with his son, Samson Schmitt, and with Christian Escoudé and Babik Reinhardt, the son of Django Reinhardt. He has also worked with Angelo Debarre, Boulou Ferré and his brother Elios Ferré, James Carter, Paquito D'Rivera, Biréli Lagrène, and a Django Reinhardt tribute band led by Brian Torff. Schmitt had a role in Latcho Drom, a documentary about gypsies for which he composed the soundtrack.

Family
His cousin Tchavolo Schmitt is also a gypsy jazz guitarist, as are his sons Samson, Bronson, and Amati.

Discography

As leader
 Hommage a La Romenes with Claudio Favari (Leico, 1983)
 Notre Histoire with Claudio Favari (Blue Flame, 1986)
 Rendez-Vous with Pierre Blanchard (Le Chant du Monde, 2004)
 Dorado Sings (EMD, 2005)
 Live at the Kennedy Center (SP, 2008)
 Family (Dreyfus/Sony, 2009)
 Live with Amati Schmitt (Stunt, 2014)
 Sinti du Monde with Amati Schmitt (Stunt, 2016)
 Clair de Lune (Stunt, 2018)

As sideman
 Samson Schmitt, Djieske (EMD, 2002)
 Tchavolo Schmitt, Live in Paris (Le Chant du Monde, 2010)

Concerts
 2008:

References

External links 
 Dorado Schmidt home page

French jazz guitarists
French male guitarists
French jazz violinists
20th-century French male violinists
French Romani people
Romani guitarists
1957 births
Living people
Gypsy jazz musicians
Swing violinists
Gypsy jazz violinists
Gypsy jazz guitarists
21st-century French male violinists
French male jazz musicians